Lophatherum is a genus of Asian and Australian plants in the grass family.

 Species
 Lophatherum gracile Brongn. - Anhui, Fujian, Guangdong, Guangxi, Guizhou, Hainan, Hubei, Hunan, Jiangsu, Jiangxi, Sichuan, Taiwan, Yunnan, Zhejiang, India, Nepal, Bhutan, Bangladesh, Sri Lanka, Indonesia, Japan, Korea, Malaysia, Indochina, Nepal, New Guinea, Philippines, Queensland 
 Lophatherum sinense Rendle - Japan, Korea, Hunan, Jiangsu, Jiangxi, Zhejiang

 Formerly included
see Poecilostachys
 Lophatherum geminatum - Poecilostachys geminata

References

Poaceae genera
Panicoideae
Taxa named by Adolphe-Théodore Brongniart